is a railway station on the Abukuma Express Line in the city of Kakuda, Miyagi, Japan.

Lines

Station layout
Kakuda Station has a two opposed side platforms connected to the station building by a footbridge. The station is staffed.

Platforms

Adjacent stations

History
Kakuda Station opened on April 1, 1968, as a station operated by Japanese National Railways (JNR). It became part of the Abukuma Express network on July 1, 1986, and a second platform was added.

Surrounding area
 National Route 113
 Kakuda City Hall
 Kakuda Post Office

See also
 List of Railway Stations in Japan

External links

  

Railway stations in Miyagi Prefecture
Abukuma Express Line
Railway stations in Japan opened in 1968
Kakuda, Miyagi